"Eat the Music" is a song written and recorded by British singer-songwriter Kate Bush. Columbia Records released it as the lead single from Bush's seventh album, The Red Shoes (1993), in the United States, while EMI chose "Rubberband Girl" everywhere else in the world. In the United Kingdom, a small handful of extremely rare 7" and promotional CD-singles were produced, but were recalled by EMI Records at the last minute. A commercial release followed in 1994 in the Netherlands and Australia, along with a handful of other countries. The single reached #10 in the U.S. Modern Rock Tracks chart.

Tricky included the song on his edition of the mix album series Back to Mine.

Critical reception
Parry Gettelman from Orlando Sentinel wrote in his review of the single, "The bizarre fruit metaphors on "Eat the Music" are exceedingly pretentious, but the song has a lilting, African high-life feel."

Track listings
All songs were written by Kate Bush, except where noted.

CD single (France)
 
EMI France - SPCD1716

CD single (US)
Columbia - 44K 77165
44T-77165

Cassette single (US)
Columbia - 44T 77165

CD single (non-US)
EMI - 7243 8 81317 2 8

Personnel
Kate Bush – vocals, keyboards
Paddy Bush – vocals
Stuart Elliott – drums, percussion
John Giblin – bass guitar
Justin Vali – valiha, kabosy, vocals
Nigel Hitchcock – tenor saxophone
Neil Sidwell – trombone
Steve Sidwell – trumpet
Paul Spong – trumpet

Charts

References

1993 singles
Kate Bush songs
Songs written by Kate Bush
1993 songs
EMI Records singles